The Uzunçayır Dam is an embankment dam on the Munzur River, located  south of Tunceli in Tunceli Province, Turkey. Constructed between 1994 and 2009, the development was backed by the Turkish State Hydraulic Works. The primary purpose of the dam is hydroelectric power generation and it supports an 84 MW power station.

See also

List of dams and reservoirs in Turkey

References

Dams in Tunceli Province
Hydroelectric power stations in Turkey
Dams completed in 2009
Dams in the Euphrates River basin